Greenbrier Mall is a nearly   regional mall in Chesapeake, Virginia, United States in the Hampton Roads metropolitan area.  The mall has a hillside terrain, with entries on both upper and lower levels. It serves communities on the east coast in the states of Virginia and North Carolina.

The mall currently has 114 retailers, three anchors (Dillard's, JCPenney, and Macy's with one vacant anchor last occupied by Sears), several eateries at the mall's food court, including Chick-fil-A, several restaurants including Abuelo's, Olive Garden, Red Robin, Black Pelican Seafood, and Cinema Café dinner movie theater.

History
The mall's original anchors were Miller & Rhoads (sold to Hecht's in 1990), Sears, and Leggett, a division of Belk. Hess's was added in 1987.

Proffitt's, which acquired the former Hess's in 1993, was sold to Dillard's in 1996. The Leggett store briefly operated as Belk before it was traded to Dillard's in 1998 as part of a mutual exchange. The former Belk became a men's and children's auxiliary store.

In 2003, Greenbrier Mall underwent an extensive renovation. Dillard's consolidated both stores to the former Proffitt's at the east end with a  reconstruction. In addition, the mall received a new color scheme and its current "G" mall logo, and the former Leggett/Belk/Dillard's building was converted to JCPenney.

In April 2004, during the renovation, CBL & Associates acquired the mall from Gregory Greenfield & Associates, Ltd. for $102.5 million.  A year later, the new JCPenney department store was completed, and officially opened at the north end of the mall. In 2006, as part of a nationwide transition, Hecht's was rebranded as Macy's.

In 2015, Sears Holdings spun off 235 of its properties, including the Sears at Greenbrier Mall, into Seritage Growth Properties.

On June 28, 2018, Sears announced that its store would be closing as part of a plan to close 78 stores nationwide. The store closed in September 2018.

In 2019, Gameworks, formerly Jillians, announced it will move to MacArthur Center by spring 2020.
However these plans has been shelved due to the closure of all (expect 1) of their locations.

In 2020, a Rosie's Gaming Emporium, a bar, four restaurants, and a hotel was proposed to take the lot formerly occupied by Sears. On September 15, 2020, Chesapeake City council withdrawn proposal because traffic concern on 2 intersections along Greenbrier Pkwy, Crosssways Blvd, and Eden Way North.

On March 10, 2022, the mall was placed into receivership with CBL & Associates anticipating returning the property to the lender. The property officially transferred to the lender in October 2022.

References

External links
Greenbrier Mall official website
CBL & Associates Properties, Inc. mall owner

Shopping malls in Virginia
Shopping malls established in 1981
CBL Properties
Tourist attractions in Chesapeake, Virginia
1981 establishments in Virginia